Savyolovskaya may refer to: 
 Moscow Savyolovsky railway station or Butyrskaya vokzal, a commuter station
 Savyolovskaya (Serpukhovsko-Timiryazevskaya line), on line 9 of the Moscow Metro
 Savyolovskaya (Bolshaya Koltsevaya line), on line 11 of the Moscow Metro